Bai-Ka-Bagh is a locality (township) of Allahabad, Uttar Pradesh, India.

References

Neighbourhoods in Allahabad